Yonsei may refer to:

 Yonsei (Japanese diaspora), descendants of Japanese emigrants
 Yonsei University, a private university in Seoul
 Severance Hospital, hospital affiliated with Yonsei University
 Yonsei Medical Journal, general medical journal